George Charles Constable (1904 – 14 April 1932) was a British long-distance runner. He competed in the men's 10,000 metres at the 1928 Summer Olympics.

References

1904 births
1932 deaths
Athletes (track and field) at the 1928 Summer Olympics
British male long-distance runners
Olympic athletes of Great Britain
Place of birth missing